Echinax is a genus of Asian and African corinnid sac spiders first described by Christa L. Deeleman-Reinhold in 2001.

Species
 it contains twelve species:
Echinax anlongensis Yang, Song & Zhu, 2004 – China
Echinax bosmansi (Deeleman-Reinhold, 1995) – Indonesia (Sulawesi)
Echinax clara Haddad, 2012 – Ghana, Congo
Echinax hesperis Haddad, 2012 – Ivory Coast
Echinax javana (Deeleman-Reinhold, 1995) – Indonesia (Java)
Echinax longespina (Simon, 1910) – West, Central, East Africa
Echinax natalensis Haddad, 2012 – South Africa
Echinax oxyopoides (Deeleman-Reinhold, 1995) (type) – China, Indonesia (Sumatra), Borneo
Echinax panache Deeleman-Reinhold, 2001 – China, India, Thailand
Echinax scharffi Haddad, 2012 – Tanzania
Echinax similis Haddad, 2012 – South Africa
Echinax spatulata Haddad, 2012 – West, Central, East Africa

References

Araneomorphae genera
Corinnidae
Spiders of Africa
Spiders of Asia